3 Compositions of New Jazz is the debut album by Anthony Braxton released in 1968 on the Delmark label. It features performances by Braxton, violinist Leroy Jenkins and trumpeter Wadada Leo Smith with pianist Muhal Richard Abrams appearing on two tracks.

Reception
The AllMusic review by Thom Jurek stated: "This is a long and tough listen, but it's a light one in comparison to For Alto. And make no mistake: It is outrageously forward-thinking, if not — arguably — downright visionary. Braxton's 3 Compositions of New Jazz is an essential document of the beginning of the end".

Track listing 

 Tracks 1–2 are graphically titled. This is an attempt to translate the titles.
Recorded at Sound Studios, Chicago, March 27 (track 1) and April 10 (tracks 2–3), 1968

Personnel
Anthony Braxton – alto saxophone, soprano saxophone, clarinet, flute, oboe musette, accordion, bells, snare drum, mixer
Leroy Jenkins – violin, viola, harmonica, bass drum, recorder, cymbals, slide whistle
Wadada Leo Smith – trumpet, mellophone, xylophone, kazoo
Muhal Richard Abrams – piano (track 2 & 3), cello, alto clarinet (track 3)

References

1968 debut albums
Anthony Braxton albums
Delmark Records albums
Albums produced by Bob Koester